Sen Sarud Castle is a historical castle located in Marand County in East Azerbaijan Province, The longevity of this fortress dates back to the 7th or 8th century AH.

References 

Castles in Iran